The Diocese of Galloway may refer to:

Diocese of Galloway, one of the thirteen (after 1633 fourteen) historical dioceses of the Scottish church
Roman Catholic Diocese of Galloway, modern Roman Catholic diocese resurrected in the late 19th century upon the model of the old diocese, but based at Dundee
Diocese of Glasgow and Galloway, Scottish episcopal created in the 18th century on the model of two earlier dioceses combined, and based at Glasgow